KTXM (99.9 FM; "Texas Thunder Radio") is a terrestrial American radio station, airing a country music format licensed to Hallettsville, Texas, simulcasting 94.3 KYKM Yoakum. The station is owned by Kremling Enterprises, Inc.

References

External links

Country radio stations in the United States
TXM